Elaphrus lecontei is a species of ground beetle in the subfamily Elaphrinae. It was described by Crotch in 1876.

References

Elaphrinae
Beetles described in 1876